National Highway 752C, commonly referred to as NH 752C is a national highway in  India. It is a spur road of National Highway 52. NH-752C traverses the state of Madhya Pradesh in India.

Route 

Zirapur -Pachor -Talen- Shujalpur-Arniya kalan- Ashta.

Junctions  

  Terminal near Zirapur.
  near Pachor.

See also 

 List of National Highways in India
 List of National Highways in India by state

References

External links 

 NH 752C on OpenStreetMap

National highways in India
National Highways in Madhya Pradesh